Verdaguer is a Catalan surname. Notable people with the surname include:

Diego Verdaguer, Argentine singer-songwriter
Dionisio Baixeras Verdaguer (1862–1943), Spanish painter
Jacint Verdaguer (1845–1902), Catalan writer

See also
Verdaguer, Barcelona metro station
Pic Verdaguer, mountain of Catalonia
38671 Verdaguer, main-belt asteroid
Verdaguer House-Museum, museum in Spain

Catalan-language surnames